

Merewith was an Anglo-Saxon Bishop of Wells. He was abbot of Glastonbury Abbey prior to being consecrated bishop about 1024. He died on either 11 April or 12 April 1033.

Notelist

Citations

References

External links
 ; also  (a redirect)

Bishops of Wells
1033 deaths
Year of birth unknown
11th-century English Roman Catholic bishops